Quercus sapotifolia is a species of oak. It is native to southern and western Mexico (as far north as Michoacán) as well as Central America. It is threatened by habitat loss.

Description
Quercus sapotifolia grows to a medium-sized tree.

Range and habitat
Quercus sapotifolia ranges through the mountains and foothills of eastern and southern Mexico and through Central America as far as central Panama, between 250 and 2,000 meters elevation.

In Mexico it is found in the southern Sierra Madre Oriental, Sierra Madre de Oaxaca, eastern Sierra Madre del Sur, as well as the Chiapas Highlands and Sierra Madre de Chiapas in the states of Hidalgo, Veracruz, Puebla, Oaxaca, and Chiapas. It is also found in the highlands of Central America, including the Sierra Madre de Chiapas and Guatemalan Highlands of Guatemala, the Maya Mountains of Belize, the Chortis Highlands of El Salvador, Honduras, and Nicaragua, and the Cordillera de Talamanca of Costa Rica and western Panama.

It grows in cloud forests, pine-oak forests, open pine woodlands. It often grows on coarse soils derived from sandstones, rapidly-draining igneous rocks with high quartz content, and rhyolitic soils with high quartz and clay content. It can grow in disturbed areas, including areas subject to fires, where soils have been eroded or leached.

References

External links
Herbarium specimen at Missouri Botanical Garden, collected in Honduras in 1936
Herbarium specimens from SEINet

sapotifolia
Trees of Central America
Oaks of Mexico
Flora of the Sierra Madre Oriental
Flora of the Sierra Madre de Oaxaca
Flora of the Sierra Madre del Sur
Flora of the Chiapas Highlands
Sierra Madre de Chiapas
Cloud forest flora of Mexico
Flora of the Central American pine–oak forests
Flora of the Central American montane forests
Plants described in 1854